Passion Guitars is a studio album by Bucky Pizzarelli and John Pizzarelli containing swing and Latin jazz standards. The album was later released as Passionate Guitars by LRC Records in an attempt to shed this version's poor marketing, which confused potential buyers into thinking this was somehow a smooth jazz album.

Track listing 
"Besame Mucho"
"Triste"
"One Note Samba"
"The Girl from Ipanema"
"Line for Lyons"
"I Found a New Baby"
"Orchids in the Moonlight"
"Maybe This Summer"
"'S Wonderful"
"A Day in the Life of a Fool"
"Meditation"

Personnel
Bucky Pizzarelliguitar
John Pizzarelliguitar
Gene Bertonciniguitar
Ray Kennedypiano
Butch Milesdrums
Martin Pizzarellidouble bass

References

2001 albums
Bucky Pizzarelli albums
John Pizzarelli albums
Latin jazz albums by American artists
Collaborative albums